Erdenetsagaan (Jewel White) is a sum (district) of Sükhbaatar Province in eastern Mongolia.

References 

Districts of Sükhbaatar Province